Josh Hill (born November 24, 1986) is a Canadian mixed martial artist who competes in the Bantamweight division. He currently fights for Bellator MMA. In the past he has competed for the WSOF, RXF, TKO Major League MMA, the Score Fighting Series and Aggression MMA. Hill also appeared on Season 18 of The Ultimate Fighter.

Background 
Hill was born in Hamilton, Ontario, Canada. He started training martial arts at age 20 and took his first professional MMA fight three years later.

Mixed martial arts career

Regional MMA 
Josh Hill took his first fight on two weeks notice and won by second-round TKO.

His fifth pro fight was for the Aggression MMA Bantamweight title. He won the championship with a unanimous decision victory over then undefeated Diego Wilson (5-0).

The Ultimate Fighter 
Starting his career undefeated, with 8 professional wins, Hill was accepted onto Season 18 of The Ultimate Fighter with Ronda Rousey and Miesha Tate.

The first episode of the show featured an elimination bout to get into the fighter house. Hill earned his place in the house by winning a majority decision over Patrick Holohan. He lost his quarterfinal bout by unanimous decision to Mike Wooten and was eliminated from the tournament.

World Series of Fighting 
Josh Hill signed with the World Series of Fighting and made his debut at WSOF Canada 2 against Mike Adams on June 7, 2014 in Edmonton, Alberta. He won the fight via knockout in the first round.

In his next fight for the promotion, Hill faced Marlon Moraes for the WSOF Bantamweight Championship on February 12, 2015 in the main event at WSOF 18: Moraes vs Hill. He lost the fight via unanimous decision (49-46, 49-46, 49-46).

After two fights outside of WSOF Hill returned at WSOF 26 to defeat Bekbulat Magomedov via split decision.

Hill earned a second shot against Marlon Moraes for the WSOF Bantamweight Championship on July 30, 2016 in the main event at WSOF 32: Moraes vs. Hill 2. He lost the fight via TKO in the second round.

Bellator MMA 
Josh Hill signed with Bellator MMA in November 2019. His debut fight came against Vinicius Zani at Bellator 239 on February 21, 2020. He won the fight via unanimous decision.

Hill faced UFC veteran Érik Pérez at Bellator 244 on August 21, 2020. He won the fight via unanimous decision.

Hill faced Raufeon Stots at Bellator 258 on May 7, 2021. He lost the bout via unanimous decision.

Hill faced Jared Scoggins on December 3, 2021 at Bellator 272. At the weigh-ins, Jared Scoggins missed weight for his bout, weighing in at 140 pounds, 4 pounds over the bantamweight non-title fight limit. The bout proceeded at catchweight and Scoggins was fined 35% of his purse which went to Hill. Hill would go on to win the fight via KO at 0:56 of round 2.

Hill was scheduled to face Enrique Barzola on April 22, 2022 at Bellator 278. Due to the pull out of two fighters from the Bellator Bantamweight World Grand Prix due to injuries, the bout was changed to a wild card qualifier for one of the spots in the tournament. Due to Covid, Hill had to pull out of the bout.

Hill was scheduled to face Matheus Mattos at Bellator 284 on August 12, 2022. However, Mattos pulled out due to a knee injury requiring knee surgery and was replaced by Marcos Breno. Hill lost the bout via unanimous decision.

Hill faced Cass Bell on March 10, 2023 at Bellator 292. At the weigh-ins, Cass Bell weighed in at 145.2 pounds, 9.2 pounds over the non-title bantamweight fight limit. The bout proceeded at catchweight with Bell being fined 50% of his purse, which went to Hill. Hill won the fight via split decision.

Personal life 
Josh was a volunteer firefighter before opening his gym and becoming a fulltime fighter.

Hill does color commentary for BTC Fight Promotions.

Championships and accomplishments

Mixed martial arts 
 Aggression MMA
 Aggression MMA Bantamweight Championship (One time)

Mixed martial arts record 

|-
|Win
|align=center| 22–5
|Cass Bell
|Decision (split)
|Bellator 292
|
|align=center|3
|align=center|5:00
|San Jose, California, United States
|
|-
|Loss
|align=center|21–5
|Marcos Breno
|Decision (unanimous)
|Bellator 284
|
|align=center|3
|align=center|5:00
|Sioux Falls, South Dakota, United States
|
|-
|Win
|align=center| 21–4
|Jared Scoggins	
|KO (punch)
|Bellator 272
|
|align=center|2
|align=center|0:56
|Uncasville, Connecticut, United States
|
|-
|Loss
|align=center| 20–4
|Raufeon Stots
|Decision (unanimous)
|Bellator 258
|
|align=center|3
|align=center|5:00
|Uncasville, Connecticut, United States
|
|-
|Win
|align=center|20–3
|Érik Pérez
|Decision (unanimous)
|Bellator 244
|
|align=center|3
|align=center|5:00
|Uncasville, Connecticut, United States
|
|-
|Win
|align=center|19–3
|Vinicius Zani
|Decision (unanimous)
|Bellator 239
|
|align=center|3
|align=center|5:00
|Thackerville, Oklahoma, United States
|
|-
|Win
|align=center|18–3
|Gilberto Aguilar
|Submission (rear naked choke)
|Fight Night 11: Lethbridge
|
|align=center|1
|align=center|2:38
|Lethbridge, Alberta, Canada
|
|-
|Win
|align=center|17–3
|Jesse Arnett
|KO (punches)
|TKO 48
|
|align=center|2
|align=center|2:11
|Gatineau, Quebec, Canada
|
|-
|Loss
|align=center|16–3
|Taylor Lapilus
|Decision (split)
|TKO 45
|
|align=center| 3
|align=center| 5:00
|Montreal, Quebec, Canada
| 
|-
|Win
|align=center|16–2
|Grachik Engibaryan
|Submission (rear naked choke)
|Fight Nights Global 72
|
|align=center| 1
|align=center| 4:12
|Sochi, Russia
|
|-
|Win
|align=center|15–2
|Xavier Alaoui
|Decision (split)
|TKO 36
|
|align=center| 3
|align=center| 5:00
|Montreal, Quebec, Canada
|
|-
|Loss
|align=center|14–2
| Marlon Moraes
| KO (head kick and punch)
| WSOF 32: Moraes vs. Hill 2
|
|align=center| 2
|align=center| 0:38
|Everett, Washington, United States
|
|-
| Win
|align=center|14–1
| Bendy Casimir
| Decision (unanimous)
| Fight Night 1
|
|align=center| 3
|align=center| 5:00
|Rama, Ontario, Canada
| 
|-
|Win
|align=center|13–1
| Bekbulat Magomedov
| Decision (split)
| WSOF 26
|
|align=center| 3
|align=center| 5:00
|Las Vegas, Nevada, United States
|
|-
|Win
|align=center|12–1
| Ioan Vrânceanu
| Decision (unanimous)
| RXF 19
|
|align=center| 3
|align=center| 5:00
|Galați, Romania
|
|-
|Win
|align=center|11–1
| Josh Rettinghouse
| Submission (rear naked choke)
| GWFC 2
|
|align=center| 3
|align=center| 2:01
|Burlington, Ontario, Canada
|
|-
|Loss
|align=center|10–1
| Marlon Moraes
| Decision (unanimous)
| WSOF 18: Moraes vs. Hill
|
|align=center| 5
|align=center| 5:00
|Edmonton, Alberta, Canada
| 
|-
|Win
|align=center|10–0
| Mike Adams
| KO (punch)
| WSOF Canada 2
|
|align=center| 1
|align=center| 4:20
|Edmonton, Alberta, Canada
|
|-
|Win
|align=center|9–0
| John Fraser
| Decision (unanimous)
| Score Fighting Series 5: Fraser vs. Hill
|
|align=center| 3
|align=center| 5:00
|Hamilton, Ontario, Canada
|
|-
|Win
|align=center|8–0
| Eric Wilson
| Decision (unanimous)
| Score Fighting Series 4
|
|align=center| 3
|align=center| 5:00
|Hamilton, Ontario, Canada
|
|-
|Win
|align=center|7–0
| Federico Lopez
| Decision (unanimous)
| Global Warriors FC 1: Uprising
|
|align=center| 3
|align=center| 5:00
|Hamilton, Ontario, Canada
|
|-
|Win
|align=center|6–0
| Darin Cooley
| Decision (unanimous)
| Score Fighting Series 1
|
|align=center| 3
|align=center| 5:00
|Mississauga, Ontario, Canada
|
|-
|Win
|align=center|5–0
| Diego Wilson
| Decision (unanimous)
| AMMA 6: Punishment
|
|align=center| 3
|align=center| 5:00
|Edmonton, Alberta, Canada
| 
|-
|Win
|align=center|4–0
| Brent Franczuz
| Submission (rear naked choke)
| W-1 MMA 5: Judgment Day
|
|align=center| 3
|align=center| 4:00
|Montreal, Quebec, Canada
|
|-
|Win
|align=center|3–0
| Dennis Gagne
| TKO (punches)
| W-1 MMA 4: Bad Blood
|
|align=center| 3
|align=center| 5:00
|Montreal, Quebec, Canada
|
|-
|Win
|align=center|2–0
| Randy Turner
| Decision (unanimous)
| Wreck MMA: Fight for the Troops
|
|align=center| 3
|align=center| 5:00
|Gatineau, Quebec, Canada
|
|-
|Win
|align=center|1–0
| Vito Attanasi
| TKO (punches)
| W-1 MMA 3: High Voltage
|
|align=center| 2
|align=center| 1:42
|Gatineau, Quebec, Canada
|

Sources

See also
 List of current Bellator fighters
 List of male mixed martial artists
 List of Bellator MMA alumni

References 

1986 births
Canadian male mixed martial artists
Bantamweight mixed martial artists
Mixed martial artists utilizing Brazilian jiu-jitsu
Canadian practitioners of Brazilian jiu-jitsu
Living people
Sportspeople from Hamilton, Ontario